EquaTerra was acquired by KPMG effective February 18, 2011. As a member of KPMG's network of member firms, EquaTerra continues to provide global sourcing advisory services in information technology (IT), finance and accounting (F&A), human resources (HR), supply chain management and other business processes.

History 
EquaTerra was founded in 2003 by Mark Toon, Mark Hodges and David Karabinos. The firm worked with clients in 19 languages in over 60 countries.

In 2005, the firm acquired Insource Partners, a Dallas based information technology consulting firm.

In November 2006, EquaTerra announced the acquisition of Avanti Advisory, LLC, an outsourcing advisory firm founded in 2001 by Peter Iannone, past president of TPI.

In September 2007, EquaTerra acquired the largest European sourcing advisory firm, Morgan Chambers.

Created in 2005, EquaTerra Public Sector LLC was the entity under which EquaTerra's public sector practice operated.

In 2009, EquaTerra announced the formation of EquaSiis, a wholly owned company focused on market intelligence and improving operational performance through EquaSiis software and tools. EquaSiis offered sourcing and operational governance software – EquaSiis Enterprise and Workbench along with research and consulting services for outsourcing service providers.

Effective February 18, 2011, KPMG LLP (US), KPMG Holdings Limited (UK) and KPMG International acquired the business and subsidiaries of advisory firm EquaTerra Inc.

Rankings 
In 2009 the Black Book of Outsourcing ranked EquaTerra as #1 Finance & Accounting Advisor, third ranked Full Service Sourcing Advisor, fourth ranked Business Process Outsourcing Advisor, ninth ranked IT Advisor, and eighth ranked HR advisor.

In both 2009 and 2010, The International Association of Outsourcing Professionals, (IAOP), ranked EquaTerra as #2 in their listings, IAOP World's Best Outsourcing Advisors.

References

External links 
Official web site of the firm

KPMG
Companies based in Houston
International management consulting firms
American companies established in 2003
Consulting firms established in 2003
Management consulting firms of the United States
Privately held companies based in Texas
2003 establishments in Texas